JCSAT-17 is a geostationary communications satellite operated by SKY Perfect JSAT Group. The satellite was designed and manufactured by Lockheed Martin Space on the LM-2100 platform, and was launched on 18 February 2020 on an Ariane 5. The satellite mainly provides service to Japan and the surrounding regions. Utilizing several S-band transponders with a flexible processor, the satellite has the capability to redirect communications capacity to concentrate on disaster relief efforts or other high-volume events.

History 
On 3 February 2016, SKY Perfect JSAT awarded Lockheed Martin Space Systems a contract to build JCSAT-17 using a modernized variant of the A2100 satellite bus. Eventually, this bus became known as LM-2100, which is expected to provide JCSAT-17 with a minimum 15-year lifespan.

On 4 January 2017, SKY Perfect JSAT announced it had contracted Arianespace to launch JCSAT-17 on an Ariane 5 ECA. The satellite was shipped to Kourou in January 2020.

Spacecraft 
JCSAT-17 was built by Lockheed Martin Space Systems on the LM-2100 platform. The spacecraft uses an 18-metre reflecting antenna to provide targeted S-band communications to Japan and surrounding regions. Once in orbit, the new satellite unfurled a 18-metre-diameter S-band mesh communications antenna made by L3Harris Technologies, formerly known as Harris Corp., of Melbourne, Florida. The spacecraft uses Ku-band transceivers for aircraft avionics communications.

Launch 
JCSAT-17 was launched from Guiana Space Centre ELA-3 on 18 February 2020 at 22:19:00 UTC aboard an Ariane 5 ECA launch vehicle. As with most Ariane 5 missions, the satellite was co-manifested and therefore shared a launch with the South Korean weather satellite GEO-KOMPSAT 2B.

Approximately 31 minutes after launch, JCSAT-17 separated from the SYLDA fairing and was released into geostationary transfer orbit.

The S-band and C-band payloads on JCSAT-17 will be used by NTT Docomo, a Japanese mobile phone company, to provide mobile connectivity across Japan and surrounding regions, according to Sky Perfect JSAT.

References 

Spacecraft launched in 2020
2020 in Japan
Communications satellites in geostationary orbit
Satellites using the A2100 bus
Communications satellites of Japan
Ariane commercial payloads